Sadvidya Sanjivini Pathasala is an institution and seminary of Sanskrit learning located in Sringeri, Karnataka.

See also
Sringeri Sharada Peetham
Bharatiya Girvana Prouda Vidya Vardhini Shala

Sringeri Sharada Peetham